José Benito de Churriguera (21 March 1665, in Madrid – 2 March 1725, in Madrid) was a Spanish architect, sculptor and urbanist of the late-Baroque or Rococo style. He was born in Madrid to a Catalan cabinetmaker, gilder and altarpiece joiner, Josep Simó Xoriguera i Elies and to doña Maria de Ocaña, and studied under his father along with two of his brothers.

His excessively decorated style, which can be described as an obsessively over-wrought horror vacui on any surface or facade, led to the adjective churrigueresque. He and his two brothers Joaquin (1674–1724) and Alberto (1676–1750) were recognized as the leading architects of their time.

Works
His works include or are found in the following:
 The altarpiece in the church for Convent of San Esteban in Salamanca
 In the New Cathedral of Salamanca.
 The church of Saint Sebastian in Madrid
 The church of San Cayetano in Madrid.
 The church of Saint Thomas in Madrid.
 The Goyeneche Palace in Madrid.
 The Goyeneche Palace, church and garden in the factory town of Nuevo Baztán, near Alcalá de Henares.
 The chapel of the Sacristy (Sagrario) in the Cathedral of Segovia.
 The altarpiece of the Transit of the Virgin in the cathedral in Palencia.

External links

 Scholarly articles in English about José Benito de Churriguera to both in web and PDF @ the Spanish Old Masters Gallery

References

 Bernard Bevan, Historia de la Arquitectura Española, Ed. Juventud S.A., 1970, 

Churriguera, Jose Benito de
Churriguera, Jose Benito de
Churriguera, Jose Benito de
Churriguera, Jose Benito de
Rococo architects